The 2012 CAF Super Cup (also known as the 2012 Orange CAF Super Cup for sponsorship reasons) was the 20th CAF Super Cup, an annual football match in Africa organized by the Confederation of African Football (CAF), between the winners of the previous season's two CAF club competitions, the CAF Champions League and the CAF Confederation Cup.

The match was played between Espérance ST from Tunisia, the winner of the 2011 CAF Champions League and Maghreb de Fès from Morocco, the winner of the 2011 CAF Confederation Cup. Maghreb de Fès won 4–3 on penalties after the match finished in a 1–1 draw.
Maghreb de Fès becomes the only team in CAF Super Cup to win it after they qualified throw CAF Considerations Cup

Teams

Rules
The CAF Super Cup is played over one match, hosted by the winner of the CAF Champions League. Since 2011, the regulations have been changed such that in case of a draw the two teams would directly move to post match penalties (no extra time is played).

Match details

References

External links
CAF Super Cup

Super
2012
Espérance ST matches
Sports competitions in Radès
21st century in Radès
Association football penalty shoot-outs